Below are the squads for the Football at the 2022 Mediterranean Games, hosted in Oran, Algeria, and took place between 26 June and 5 July 2022. Teams were national U18 sides.

Group A

Algeria
Head coach: Mourad Slatni

France

Morocco
Head coach: Mohamed Ouahbi

Spain

Group B

Greece

Italy
Head coach: Daniele Franceschini

The squad was officially announced on 15 July 2022.

Note: Samuele Vignato was part of the original squad, but was then replaced with Luca D'Andrea due to injury.

Portugal

Turkey

References

Squads
Mediterranean Games football squads